Xanthophryne is a small genus of toads in the family Bufonidae. They are endemic to the Western Ghats in Maharashtra, India. Its sister taxon is Duttaphrynus. The name Xanthophryne is derived from two Greek words, xanthos meaning yellow and phryne meaning toad.

Description
Xanthophryne are relatively small toads: adult males measure  and females  in snout–vent length. They have light brown dorsum with a suffusion of dull chrome-yellow; flanks and sides of the abdomen have chrome-yellow patches, sometimes a few continuous bands. The tympanum is indistinct. There is no webbing between the toes and fingers. Eggs are laid in clutches.

Species
There are two species in this genus:
Xanthophryne koynayensis (Soman, 1963)
Xanthophryne tigerina Biju, Van Bocxlaer, Giri, Loader, and Bossuyt, 2009

References

External links

 
Amphibians of Asia
Endemic fauna of the Western Ghats
Amphibian genera
Taxa named by Sathyabhama Das Biju